Sofia Kenin was the defending champion, but chose to compete in Adelaide instead.

Elena Rybakina won the title, defeating Zhang Shuai in the final, 7–6(9–7), 6–3.

Seeds

Draw

Finals

Top half

Bottom half

Qualifying

Seeds

Qualifiers

Lucky loser

Qualifying draw

First qualifier

Second qualifier

Third qualifier

Fourth qualifier

Fifth qualifier

Sixth qualifier

References

External links
 Main Draw
 Qualifying Draw

Hobart International
Singles